Lindy Hemming (born 21 August 1948) is a Welsh costume designer, who won the Academy Award for Best Costume Design for the 1999 film Topsy-Turvy.
Hemming's name is an example of an aptronym.

Career

After she studied at the Royal Academy of Dramatic Art, she designed costumes for productions at West End theatres, the Royal Shakespeare Company and the Royal National Theatre, and has also designed the costumes for the James Bond films from GoldenEye (1995) to Casino Royale (2006).

Other films she has worked on include The Krays (1990), Four Weddings and a Funeral (1994), Lara Croft: Tomb Raider (2001), Harry Potter and the Chamber of Secrets (2002), Lara Croft: Tomb Raider – The Cradle of Life (2003), Christopher Nolan's Batman films Batman Begins (2005), The Dark Knight (2008), The Dark Knight Rises (2012), and Wonder Woman (2017).

At the Costume Designers Guild Awards 2008 and Costume Designers Guild Awards 2017, she won Best Costume Design in a Fantasy Film for The Dark Knight and Wonder Woman, respectively. Wonder Woman was also nominated for the Critics' Choice Movie Award for Best Costume Design in 2017, becoming the first superhero film to receive this nomination.

Two of Lindy Hemming's costumes from the movie Tomorrow Never Dies can be found in the Dezer Collection currently on display in Miami.

References

External links

1948 births
Alumni of RADA
Best Costume Design Academy Award winners
British costume designers
Living people
Welsh designers
Women costume designers